The Table tennis competition at the 2002 Central American and Caribbean Games was held in the Feria Internacional stadium in San Salvador, El Salvador, between November 22 to 30.

Medal summary

Men's events

Women's events

Mixed events

References

2002 Central American and Caribbean Games
2002 in table tennis
2002